The Flatshare is a British comedy drama series based on Beth O'Leary's 2019 novel of the same name. The series was developed by 42 in association with VIS for Paramount+. It premiered on 1 December 2022.

Cast
 Jessica Brown Findlay as Tiffany "Tiffy" Moore
 Anthony Welsh as Leon Twomey
 Gina Bramhill as Rachel
 Jonah Hauer-King as Mo
 Shaniqua Okwok as Maia Constantine
 Shaq B. Grant as Richie Twomey
 Dustin Demri-Burns as Phil
 Bart Edwards as Justin
 Klariza Clayton as Kay
 Jo Martin as Pauline
 Bill Milner as Si
 Sophie Thompson as Katherine
 Juliet Cowan as Gillian

Episodes

Production
It was revealed in January 2020 that 42 had picked up the rights to adapt Beth O'Leary's novel. The adaptation was at the time in development with the BBC. In January 2022, Paramount+ officially commissioned the six-part series, marking the platform's first British comedy. The writing room includes executive producer Rose Lewenstein as lead writer as well as Sarah Simmonds, Ryan Calais Cameron, and Alex Straker. Peter Cattaneo and Chloë Wicks directed the first and second blocks respectively. Executive producers include Miriam Brent, Rory Aitken and Eleanor Moran of 42 with Rhonda Smith producing.

In February 2022, it was announced Jessica Brown Findlay and Anthony Welsh would star as the leads Tiffy and Leon. Also joining the cast were Bart Edwards, Shaq B. Grant, Shaniqua Okwok, and Jonah Hauer-King.

Principal photography wrapped in late-May 2022. Filming took place in Bristol, Brighton and London.

Release
The Flatshare premiered in the UK, Australia and Canada on Paramount+ on 1 December 2022. It is scheduled to launch in the US and other international markets in mid-2023.

References

External links

2020s British drama television series
2020s British romance television series
2022 British television series debuts
English-language television shows
Paramount+ original programming
Television shows based on British novels
Television shows set in London